"There Was an Old Woman" is the forty-eighth episode and the thirteenth episode of the third season (1988–89) of the television series The Twilight Zone. This episode follows the adventures of a children's book author.

Plot
Hallie Parker is a disillusioned author of children's books, believing that her stories do not appeal to the "video generation". Aside from writing, she is passionate in reading children her stories in the local library. However, since new forms of entertainment are overlapping the old her audience has dwindled. One day a woman named Nancy Harris requests Hallie autograph one of her books for her son Brian, who is sick. Hallie, overcome with sympathy, offers to visit him in person.

When she arrives, Hallie shows Brian the autograph she wrote for him and reads to him from the book. Brian asks her if she will come back and read more but Hallie tells him she is moving to Arizona.

At her home, Hallie is woken by sounds of laughing children, and confronted by blowing drapes, moving rocking chairs, and a window broken by a baseball. When her real estate agent visits with a young couple looking to buy her house, she persists in following them around and making awkward conversation during the tour. When one of the couple slips on a roller skate left on the stairs, they deem that the last straw and storm out. The real estate agent suggests that Hallie does not really want to sell the house.

Hallie discovers the book she signed for Brian. Thinking it must have been stolen, she calls the Harris house. Nancy says that Brian died and the book was buried with him. Hallie hears voices upstairs, and goes to investigate. She finds ghosts of Brian and other children. They want Hallie to stay and read them stories. She is relieved when she realizes that she is now useful and has a reason to stay in her home.

External links
 

1988 American television episodes
The Twilight Zone (1985 TV series season 3) episodes
Television episodes about ghosts

fr:Il était une fois (La Cinquième Dimension)